Alcibiades is a 1675 tragedy by the English writer Thomas Otway, based on the life of the Athenian statesman and general Alcibiades. Staged by the Duke's Company, it premiered at the Dorset Garden Theatre in London with a cast that featured Thomas Betterton as  Alcibiades, Matthew Medbourne as  Agis, Samuel Sandford as Tissaphernes, John Crosby as Patroclus, Henry Harris as Theramnes, Thomas Gillow as Polyndus, Mary Lee as Deidamia, Mary Betterton as Timandra and Elizabeth Barry as Draxilla.

References

Bibliography
 Van Lennep, W. The London Stage, 1660-1800: Volume One, 1660-1700. Southern Illinois University Press, 1960.

1675 plays
West End plays
Tragedy plays
Plays by Thomas Otway
Biographical plays
Plays set in ancient Greece
Plays set in the 5th century BC